The SUNYAC men's basketball tournament is the annual conference basketball championship tournament for the NCAA Division III State University of New York Athletic Conference. The tournament has been held annually since 1980. It is a single-elimination tournament and seeding is based on regular season records.

The winner receives the SUNYAC's automatic bid to the NCAA Men's Division III Basketball Championship.

Results

Championship records

 Schools highlighted in pink are former members of the SUNYAC
 Morrisville never qualified for the tournament finals as members of the SUNYAC

References

NCAA Division III men's basketball conference tournaments
Basketball Tournament, Men's
Recurring sporting events established in 1980